Pablo Reyero (born 29 March 1966) is an Argentine film director and screenwriter. He has directed three films since 1998. His film La cruz del sur was screened in the Un Certain Regard section at the 2003 Cannes Film Festival.

Filmography
 Dársena sur (1998)
 La cruz del sur (2003)
 Angeles caídos (2007)

References

External links

1966 births
Living people
Argentine film directors
Argentine screenwriters
Male screenwriters
Argentine male writers
People from Buenos Aires